The 2011 Masters Tournament was the 75th Masters Tournament, held April 7–10 at Augusta National Golf Club. Charl Schwartzel birdied the final four holes to win his first major championship, two strokes ahead of runners-up Adam Scott and Jason Day.

Eight players held a share of the lead in the last round including Tiger Woods and Rory McIlroy. McIlroy had at least a share of the lead for the first three rounds and had a four stroke advantage entering Sunday's final round, but shot an 80 to finish ten strokes behind Schwartzel.

This was Ben Crenshaw's 40th consecutive Masters appearance. The top-ranked player in the world, Martin Kaymer, failed to make the cut, and Hideki Matsuyama was the only amateur to play on the weekend.

Course

Field
The Masters has the smallest field of the major championships. Officially the Masters remains an invitation event, but there is a set of qualifying criteria that determines who is included in the field. Each player is classified according to the first category by which he qualified, and other categories are shown in parentheses.

Golfers who qualify based solely on their performance in amateur tournaments (categories 6-10) must remain amateurs on the starting day of the tournament to be eligible to play.

1. Past Masters Champions
Ángel Cabrera (2), Fred Couples (11), Ben Crenshaw, Trevor Immelman (11), Zach Johnson (14,15,16,17,18,19), Sandy Lyle, Phil Mickelson (11,12,15,16,17,18,19), Larry Mize, José María Olazábal, Mark O'Meara, Vijay Singh, Craig Stadler, Tom Watson, Mike Weir, Tiger Woods (2,3,4,11,12,18,19), Ian Woosnam

(Past champions who did not play: Tommy Aaron, Seve Ballesteros, Jack Burke Jr., Billy Casper, Charles Coody, Nick Faldo, Raymond Floyd, Doug Ford, Bob Goalby, Bernhard Langer, Jack Nicklaus, Arnold Palmer, Gary Player, and Fuzzy Zoeller.  Nicklaus and Palmer served as "honorary starters" and teed off on the first day at the first hole to kick off the tournament.)

2. Last five U.S. Open Champions
Lucas Glover, Graeme McDowell (12,16,18,19), Geoff Ogilvy (15,17,18,19)

3. Last five British Open Champions
Stewart Cink (18), Pádraig Harrington (4,18,19), Louis Oosthuizen (13,16,18,19)

4. Last five PGA Champions
Martin Kaymer (12,14,16,18,19), Y. E. Yang (11,18,19)

5. Last three winners of The Players Championship
Tim Clark (15,16,17,18,19), Sergio García, Henrik Stenson (13)

6. Top two finishers in the 2010 U.S. Amateur
David Chung (a), Peter Uihlein (a)

7. Winner of the 2010 Amateur Championship
Jin Jeong (a)

8. Winner of the 2010 Asian Amateur
Hideki Matsuyama (a)

9. Winner of the 2010 U.S. Amateur Public Links
Lion Kim (a)

10. Winner of the 2010 U.S. Mid-Amateur
Nathan Smith (a)

11. The top 16 finishers and ties in the 2010 Masters Tournament
Ricky Barnes, K. J. Choi (17,18,19), Miguel Ángel Jiménez (18,19), Jerry Kelly, Anthony Kim (15,18,19), Hunter Mahan (15,16,17,18,19), Steve Marino, Ryan Moore (17,18,19), Ian Poulter (18,19), David Toms, Nick Watney (15,16,17,18,19), Lee Westwood (13,16,18,19)

12. Top 8 finishers and ties in the 2010 U.S. Open
Alex Čejka, Ernie Els (15,17,18,19), Grégory Havret, Dustin Johnson (15,16,17,18,19), Matt Kuchar (15,16,17,18,19), Davis Love III, Brandt Snedeker

13. Top 4 finishers and ties in the 2010 British Open Championship
Paul Casey (15,17,18,19), Rory McIlroy (14,15,16,18,19)

14. Top 4 finishers and ties in the 2010 PGA Championship
Bubba Watson (15,16,17,18,19)

15. Top 30 leaders on the 2010 PGA Tour official money earnings list
Robert Allenby (17,18,19), Ben Crane (17,18,19), Jason Day (16,17,18,19), Luke Donald (16,17,18,19), Rickie Fowler (18,19), Jim Furyk (16,17,18,19), Retief Goosen (17,18,19), Bill Haas (19), Charley Hoffman (16,17), Jeff Overton (17), Ryan Palmer (17), Justin Rose (16,17,18,19), Adam Scott (16,17,18,19), Heath Slocum, Steve Stricker (16,17,18,19), Bo Van Pelt (17,18,19), Camilo Villegas (17,18,19)

16. Winners of PGA Tour events that award a full-point allocation for the season-ending Tour Championship, between the 2010 Masters Tournament and the 2011 Masters Tournament
Stuart Appleby, Arjun Atwal, Aaron Baddeley, Jason Bohn, Jonathan Byrd, Martin Laird (17,18,19), Carl Pettersson, D. A. Points, Rory Sabbatini, Jhonattan Vegas, Mark Wilson (19), Gary Woodland

17. All players qualifying for the 2010 edition of The Tour Championship
Kevin Na, Kevin Streelman

18. Top 50 on the final 2010 Official World Golf Rankings list
Ross Fisher (19), Hiroyuki Fujita, Peter Hanson (19), Yuta Ikeda (19), Ryo Ishikawa (19), Robert Karlsson (19), Kim Kyung-tae (19), Edoardo Molinari (19), Francesco Molinari (19), Sean O'Hair, Álvaro Quirós (19), Charl Schwartzel (19)

19. Top 50 on the Official World Golf Rankings list on March 27, 2011
Anders Hansen

20. International invitees
None

Round summaries

First round
Thursday, April 7, 2011

Rory McIlroy and Álvaro Quirós shot 65 to co-lead after the first round. K. J. Choi and Y. E. Yang shot 67 to trail by two shots. Defending champion Phil Mickelson shot a 70 and Tiger Woods a 71. Henrik Stenson struggled to an 83, including a quintuple bogey 8 on the par-3 4th hole, the highest score on the hole in the history of the Masters.

Second round
Friday, April 8, 2011

McIlroy kept his lead with a 69 (−3), while Quirós shot a 73 (+1) to fall back to −6, four shots off the lead. Jason Day, in his first Masters appearance, shot a tournament-low 64 (−8) on Friday to move into second place. Tiger Woods shot a 66 to put himself back in the tournament at −7, three shots off the lead. Woods shot 31 on the back nine to charge up the leaderboard. K. J. Choi shot a 70 to move to −7, into third place along with Woods. Notable players who missed the cut were Graeme McDowell, Martin Kaymer, Pádraig Harrington, and Hunter Mahan.

Amateurs: Matsuyama (+1), Chung (+4), Kim (+4), Uihlein (+5), Jeong (+6), Smith (+8).

Third round
Saturday, April 9, 2011

Rory McIlroy held at least a share of the lead for the third straight day. After playing the first 12 holes in one-over par, he birdied 13, 15 and 17 to gain a four shot lead. 2009 champion Ángel Cabrera stormed into second place with a 67 to play in the final pairing on Sunday for the second time in three years. Jason Day, who held the outright lead after hole 5, shot 72 and was also 4 shots back. Tiger Woods struggled to a 74 after a 66 on Friday. Cabrera, Bubba Watson and Adam Scott all shot 67, the round of the day.

Final round
Sunday, April 10, 2011

Summary
Eight different players had at least a share of the lead at one point during the final round, included five simultaneously on the back nine.  Rory McIlroy, the 54-hole leader, shot 37 on the front to hold onto the lead, but made triple bogey on 10 and a four-putt double bogey on 12 to quickly fade with a final round 80. He finished ten strokes back in a tie for 15th place. Tiger Woods, who was seven shots back to start the final round, shot 31 on the front nine, including an eagle at 8, to tie for the lead, but a three-putt bogey on 12 and a missed  eagle putt on 15 doomed his chance at a fifth Masters title. Woods had previously never come from behind in the final round to win any of his 14 major championships. Geoff Ogilvy, also seven shots back to start the day, birdied 12 through 16 to share the lead, but came up short of his second major. K. J. Choi tied for the lead with a birdie at the 9th hole, but struggled putting on the back nine and finished in a tie for 8th. 2009 champion Ángel Cabrera also shared the lead but bogeys at 12 and 16 led to a solo 7th-place finish.

Adam Scott stormed up the leader board and after a birdie at 16 held a two shot lead. Jason Day made a  birdie putt on 17 and another birdie on 18 to post −12, a share of the clubhouse lead with Scott. However, the day belonged to Charl Schwartzel, who chipped in for birdie at 1, holed out for eagle on 3, and birdied the final four holes to win by two shots; his 66 was the low round of the day. It was Schwartzel's first major win, and he became the third South African to win the Masters, along with Gary Player and Trevor Immelman. It was also the 50th anniversary of Player's 1961 Masters win, when he became the first international player to win the Masters.

Final leaderboard

Scorecard

Cumulative tournament scores, relative to par
{|class="wikitable" span = 50 style="font-size:85%;
|-
|style="background: Red;" width=10|
|Eagle
|style="background: Pink;" width=10|
|Birdie
|style="background: PaleGreen;" width=10|
|Bogey
|style="background: Green;" width=10|
|Double bogey
|style="background: Olive;" width=10|
|Triple bogey+
|}
Source:

References

External links
Masters.com – past winners and results
Coverage on the European Tour's official site
Augusta.com – 2011 Masters leaderboard and scorecards

2011
2011 in golf
2011 in American sports
2011 in sports in Georgia (U.S. state)
April 2011 sports events in the United States